Refresh the Demon is the fifth  studio album by Canadian heavy metal band Annihilator, released on March 11, 1996 by Music for Nations.

Track listing

Personnel
Jeff Waters - Vocals, Guitars, Bass
Randy Black - Drums
Dave Scott Davis - Guitar solos on Tracks 4, 6, 7, and 8
Lou Bujdoso - Backing Vocals

References

1996 albums
Annihilator (band) albums
Music for Nations albums